Many early locomotive works disappeared as railways merged or they became simply motive power depots. Some, like Bromsgrove, made only one or two new locomotives but, for  even the largest, overhaul and repair of the existing fleet was the main activity.

See also List of locomotive builders and List of early British private locomotive manufacturers

Sources
 Atkins, P., (1999) The Golden Age of Steam Locomotive Building, Penrhyn: Atlantic Transport Publications
 Larkin, E.J., Larkin, J.G., (1988) The Railway Workshops of Great Britain 1823–1986, Macmillan Press

 
 
British railway-owned locomotive builders